Horse Opera was the 13th album of the Western swing trio Riders in the Sky, released in 1990, although most of it was recorded back in 1978 at the time of the band's first forming.

Track listing
"Ride Cowboy Ride" – 2:07
"Maybe I'll Cry Over You" – 3:03
"Texas Echo" – 2:50
"Slocum Intro" – 0:50
"What Would I do Without You" – 2:47
"The Arms of My Love" – 2:17
"Homecoming Yodel" – 2:40
"Call of the Canyon" – 2:38
"Drywall Intro" – 0:32
"Livin' in a Mobile Home" – 2:50
"The Line Rider" – 3:30
"Sidekick Heaven" – 6:55
"Somebody's Got to Do It" – 3:03

Personnel
Douglas B. Green (a.k.a. Ranger Doug) – guitar, vocals
Paul Chrisman (a.k.a. Woody Paul) – fiddle, guitar, banjo, vocals
Fred LaBour (a.k.a. Too Slim) – bass, vocals

1990 albums